Neste is a Finnish oil refining company. Neste may also refer to
Communes in south-western France
Bazus-Neste
La Barthe-de-Neste
Mazères-de-Neste
Saint-Laurent-de-Neste

Other
Neste (river) in France
Van Neste, a surname
Neste sommer, a studio album by Norwegian rock band deLillos
Neste barco à vela, a Portuguese son